Battletruck (also known as Warlords of the 21st Century in the U.S. and Destructors in Italy) is a 1982 New Zealand post-apocalyptic science fiction action film co-written and directed by Harley Cokliss and starring Michael Beck, Annie McEnroe, James Wainwright, John Ratzenberger, and Bruno Lawrence.

Set in the aftermath of a devastating series of wars referred to as the Oil Wars, the plot is a futuristic tale of a community fighting against a local warlord in the lawless rural countrywide. A co-production between New Zealand and the United Kingdom, it was filmed on location in New Zealand and starring a number of local actors, and was part of a wave of similarly-themed films made in the wake of the success of the Mad Max series.

Plot 
In the near future, Earth has been devastated by a series of wars referred to as "the Oil Wars" over depleting petroleum reserves. The regions around the oil producing Mesopotamia Basin are largely radioactive wastelands due to limited nuclear exchange; oil fields in Saudi Arabia and most of the Middle East burn out of control. Food riots have become common in many cities around the world which are now under martial law. Much of the American rural countryside has become lawless with the majority of remaining military and police trying to maintain order in the cities. Large groups of citizens are fleeing cities to the countryside to find food and any remaining fuel reserves. What little petroleum remains in these regions has become a precious commodity fought over by vicious warlords and mercenaries. A war party led by former U.S. Army Colonel Jacob Straker (James Wainwright), traveling in a large, heavily armed, armored truck, intercept two traders riding in a horse-drawn carriage with large amount of diesel fuel, killing one of the traders. The surviving trader takes the war party to the source, which is a hidden supply depot lost during the local government's collapse and thought to be radioactive. Straker orders his men to setup camp to use the supply depot as a base of operations.

Straker's daughter Coraline "Corlie" (Annie McEnroe) refuses to execute the surviving trader. While Straker plans the camp's defense at night, she runs away and flees through the open desert. Corlie is saved from a squad of men sent to return her to the camp by Hunter (Michael Beck), an ex-soldier armed with a high-tech motorbike. Corlie lies about her past and claims she was a hostage taken after her family died. Needing further medical attention for a leg injury, Hunter takes Corlie to live in the walled city of Clearwater Farm, governed as a strict old-fashioned democracy, where she is quickly accepted by the community. However, she is soon discovered by her father's men who take over the Clearwater community to feed Straker's war party.  Corlie steals a horse and manages to escape back to Hunter's remote farm in the woods.

The mercenaries terrorize and pillage the community. Straker tortures the resident mechanic Rusty (John Ratzenberger) into giving him the location of Hunter's secret hideout. Straker moves to attack Hunter's farm and recapture Corlie. Hunter and Corlie escape on his motorbike and Straker, in a rage, plows through Hunter's residence with his armored truck. Hunter takes Corlie back to the Clearwater people and asks Rusty to build him an armored car to attack Straker's "battletruck".  While Rusty and Hunter and a few others are thus occupied, one of the residents turns traitor and knocks out Corlie, puts her in a horse-drawn wagon, and heads out to deliver her back to Straker. Hunter tries to stop him, but the traitor sets an ambush for him and wounds him with a crossbow.  Believing that he has killed Hunter, the traitor appears at Straker's headquarters with Corlie in the wagon.

Meanwhile, Hunter regains consciousness and manages to limp back to Clearwater on his bike. While getting patched up there, Rusty finishes the armored car and shortly Hunter takes off in it, despite the fact that he is wounded.  He attacks Straker's headquarters, plowing through buildings and tents and eventually dropping a grenade into Straker's 50,000 liter diesel fuel supply, destroying the fuel. He then runs and Straker, now in a towering rage, takes off after him. In the process, he forces the driver to drive the truck at a higher speed, overheating the turbines. This stresses out the driver (who loves the truck) and leads to dissension between him and Straker. Hunter, meanwhile, gets some distance ahead, jumps out of the car and climbs to a high place overlooking the road and it is now revealed that the whole attack on Straker's headquarters was a ruse to lure the truck into an ambush. The Clearwater people are at a overlooking ridge waiting for Hunter with his motorcycle and a 66mm rocket launcher which Hunter had given them earlier in the film. Hunter fires a couple of armor-piercing rockets at the moving truck, but only one round hits which causes slight damage and a small fire, which causes more stress between Straker and the truck driver. The driver attempts to kill Straker, who he feels is uselessly destroying the truck. Straker kills the driver who slumps over the wheel and now the truck, throttle set to full, is more or less out of control.

Back on the motorbike again, Hunter manages to jump onto the moving truck through a hole in the top that one of his rockets had made. A battle ensues, the truck still careening wildly back and forth while Corlie tries to control it with the dead body of the driver slumped over the wheel and Straker furiously shouting commands to everyone. Eventually, Hunter fights his way to the front, temporarily stuns Straker, grabs Corlie, and jumps with her from the back of the still-wildly out of control battletruck with Straker still in it and still screaming, making death threats, and bumbling about the smoking ruins of the interior of the truck before it falls off a cliff, crashes and explodes, killing him.

Hunter and Corlie end up back at Clearwater, where Corlie apparently settles for good as part of the community. Ever the loner, Hunter rides off into the sunset on a horse, promising Corlie that he will be back "sometime".

Cast
 Michael Beck as Hunter 
 Annie McEnroe as Coraline "Corlie"
 James Wainwright as Col. Jacob Straker
 Bruno Lawrence as Willie
 John Ratzenberger as Rusty
 John Bach as Bone 
 Randy Powell as Judd
 Diana Rowan as Charlene
 Kelly Johnson as Alvin
 Mark Hadlow as Orrin
 Marshall Napier as Poole

Production notes 
Battletruck was filmed on the Central Otago plains in New Zealand. Despite being produced by a Hollywood studio and being considered a Hollywood release, the film largely used a New Zealand crew and New Zealand actors. It followed the success of films such as Mad Max and was made in New Zealand in part due to the 1981 Writers Guild of America strike.

Soundtrack

The music for the film was composed and conducted by Kevin Peek and performed by Eastern Orbit and the New Zealand Symphony Orchestra.

Track listing
 "Battletruck" (4:14)
 "Black Devil" (4:14)
 "Peaceful Village" (1:35)
 "Wandering Wolf" (3:34)
 "Blazing Waste" (3:17)
 "Corlie, My Love" (1:10)
 "Boundless Field" (2:20)
 "Rider in Gale" (3:40)
 "Corlie is at Crisis" (1:40)
 "Hunter's Counterattack" (2:13)
 "Never Forget" (1:28)
 "Persuit" (sic) (2:09)
 "Battletruck in Flames" (5:20)

See also 
Other films set in a post-apocalytic future, specially on wasteland scenario:
Damnation Alley (1977), directed by Jack Smight
 Mad Max (1979) and Mad Max 2: The Road Warrior (1981), both directed by George Miller
Exterminators of the Year 3000 (1983), directed by Giuliano Carnimeo
The New Barbarians (1983), directed by Enzo G. Castellari
 Stryker (1983) and Wheels of Fire (1985), both directed by Cirio H. Santiago
 Solarbabies (1986), directed by Alan Johnson
Steel Dawn (1987), directed by Lance Hool
Cyborg (1989), directed by Albert Pyun
 Desert Warrior (1988), directed by Jim Goldman
 Empire of Ash (1988) and Empire of Ash III (1989), directed by Michael Mazo

References

External links 
 
 Battletruck (1982) at New Zealand Feature Film Database
 Moria
 NZ On Screen page

1982 films
American adventure films
1980s adventure films
1980s science fiction action films
American science fiction action films
American dystopian films
Films based on science fiction novels
Films directed by Harley Cokeliss
Films set in the 21st century
Films shot in New Zealand
American independent films
Peak oil films
American post-apocalyptic films
WingNut Films films
New Zealand independent films
1982 independent films
New Zealand post-apocalyptic films
New Zealand science fiction action films
New Zealand adventure films
1980s English-language films
1980s American films